"Caught in a Dream" is a 1971 song written by Michael Bruce and recorded by his band, Alice Cooper, on their first major label release album Love It to Death.  As the album's second single "Caught in a Dream" was released backed with "Hallowed Be My Name" in May 1971; it peaked in the US at number 94.

Coming just before the album's signature hit "I'm Eighteen", "Caught in a Dream" opens Love It to Death.  It is a straight-ahead rocker that follows simple hard-rock formulas, trading heavy riffing with guitar fills and solos,  "Caught in a Dream" was the album's second single and featured irreverent, tongue-in-cheek lyrics such as "I need everything the world owes me / I tell that to myself and I agree".

References

Works cited

 
 
 

1971 singles
Alice Cooper songs
Song recordings produced by Bob Ezrin
1971 songs
Songs written by Michael Owen Bruce
Warner Records singles